Guabito is a corregimiento and town in the Changuinola District of the Bocas del Toro Province of Panama. It is a small town located directly across the Rio Sixaola from Sixaola, Costa Rica. An elevated former railroad grade and bridge connects Guabito to Sixaola. This border crossing is popular with tourists going between Costa Rica and Bocas del Toro, though few tourists stop in Guabito longer than necessary to clear Panamanian customs.

Its population as of 1990 was 11,125; its population as of 2000 was 14,366.

References

World Gazeteer: Panama – World-Gazetteer.com

Populated places in Bocas del Toro Province
Corregimientos of Bocas del Toro Province
Costa Rica–Panama border crossings